Hypocrita speciosa is a moth of the family Erebidae. It was described by Francis Walker in 1866. It is found in Colombia.

References

 

Hypocrita
Moths described in 1866